The Workhorse C-Series was a line of battery electric medium-duty delivery vans built by Workhorse Group for commercial package delivery company fleets, which entered limited production in 2021, were recalled that September, and were discontinued in 2022 after fewer than fifty were built. The C-Series was originally named the N-GEN when the line was first announced in 2017. N-GEN prototypes began testing in 2018 and were renamed to the C-Series in 2019.

The C-Series is closely related to the Workhorse W-15 pickup truck; both the W-15 and C-Series are derived from the candidate that Workhorse developed as a joint venture with VT Hackney for the United States Postal Service Next Generation Delivery Vehicle (NGDV) contract competition in 2016. The Workhorse/VT Hackney NGDV candidate in turn used a chassis derived from the AMP Electric/Workhorse E-GEN, which was a plug-in hybrid medium-duty truck chassis announced in 2014, shortly after AMP acquired Workhorse from Navistar.

History
AMP Electric acquired Workhorse from Navistar in March 2013 for US$5 million and unveiled the E-GEN drivetrain for the Workhorse W-88 Class 5 truck chassis in early 2014; the E-GEN was a plug-in series hybrid that used a  "Sumo" traction motor/generator provided by tm4 Electrodynamic Systems, drawing from a battery with a gross capacity of 60 kW-hr. A small flex-fuel internal combustion range extender engine from Power Solutions International with  output could be used when the vehicle was parked to recharge the battery.

A joint venture between Workhorse (responsible for the chassis and drivetrain, derived from the E-GEN) and VT Hackney (body) was selected in 2016 as one of the finalists competing for the 10-year contract to supply the USPS NGDV, which would provide up to 165,000 vehicles to replace aging and outdated Grumman LLVs and Ford-Utilimaster FFVs that had been used by USPS since 1987. The VT Hackney/Workhorse joint venture delivered their NGDV prototype candidate in September 2017 for testing by the USPS. If awarded the contract, the Workhorse/Hackney NGDV candidate was scheduled tentatively to be built at the former General Motors Lordstown Assembly factory in Lordstown, Ohio.

Shortly after the USPS NGDV candidate was photographed during testing, Workhorse announced it had developed the W-15 pickup truck and N-GEN delivery vehicle for the commercial truck/fleet market; the W-15 and N-GEN are closely related to the NGDV candidate. In a 2020 interview with The Verge, former CEO Steve Burns noted the electric N-GEN and W-15 were derived from the NGDV prototype chassis as a way to recover the investment required to develop the NGDV candidate. Testing of the first N-GEN prototypes commenced in late March 2018 with four examples leased by an unnamed company in the San Francisco Bay Area. Initial production of the larger NGEN-1000 was scheduled to commence in October.

At approximately the same time in February 2018, delivery company UPS announced that it would partner with Workhorse to develop and manufacture a fleet of 50 plug-in electric Class 5 trucks for last-mile delivery. The Workhorse/UPS trucks were based on the larger E-GEN with a cab-forward design. UPS clarified the cost of the proposed electric trucks was comparable to the cost of a conventional truck. In June of that year, UPS increased its order to 1,000, contingent on favorable acceptance testing results for the first 50, which were scheduled to be delivered that September.

DHL ordered 63 N-GEN vans with a nominal  of cargo volume in February 2019, with planned deliveries to take place later that year. In June 2019, Workhorse obtained US$25 million to continue the N-GEN delivery van project. By November 2019, Workhorse changed the name of the delivery van from N-GEN to C-Series. In November 2019, Workhorse chose battery supplier EnerDel to provide up to 5,200 battery packs for C-Series delivery vans. A prototype of the updated C-1000 (stylized with a superscript as C1000) was shown during a private event at the Transportation Research Center in East Liberty, Ohio. The smaller C650 was scheduled to be unveiled at the NTEA 2020 Work Truck Show in March 2020.

In February 2021, the NGDV contract was awarded to Oshkosh Defense. Workhorse announced what Bloomberg News described as a "long-shot bid" to overturn the loss of the award. On June 16, 2021, Workhorse filed a formal complaint with the United States Court of Federal Claims protesting the award of the NGDV contract to Oshkosh. However this complaint was dropped in September 2021 after Rick Dauch was selected in July to replace outgoing Workhorse CEO Duane Hughes.

The first C-Series van, the Workhorse C-1000, was launched in February 2021 during an event held jointly with the Pritchard Companies in Tampa, Florida. Workhorse completed a limited number of C-1000 electric vans and started shipping them in summer 2021. However, after the initial deliveries, the company announced the truck would be redesigned to increase payload capacity. In September 2021, Workhorse suspended all deliveries of the vehicle and repurchased all of the 41 vans that had been delivered to customers to-date; the company stated it needed to provide "additional testing and modifications" to comply with the Federal Motor Vehicle Safety Standards in the United States. In November 2021, Workhorse CEO Rick Dauch admitted during an earnings call that he believed the C-1000 was unreliable.

Workhorse has announced it will discontinue the C-Series after using up parts on hand to assemble 50–75 more. In March 2022, Workhorse entered an agreement with GreenPower Motor Company to purchase 1,500 EV Star CC vehicles as the basis for Workhorse W750 walk-in vans and W4CC chassis cab, which will be sold in the interim until the company begins production of two new electric commercial vehicle platforms; the W56 is a Class 5/6 truck that will start production in the third quarter of 2023 and the W34 is a Class 3/4 truck scheduled for production in 2024. Both the W56 and W34 are battery electric vehicles; the W56 uses a steel ladder-frame chassis while the W34 will use a low-floor "skateboard" chassis that will form the basis for the next electric Workhorse van.

Design

N-GEN
It was fitted with the same range extender used in the BMW i3, a 647 cc emergency-use two-cylinder engine built by Kymco for BMW; the range extender added . Like the Lordstown Endurance, the N-GEN series was designed with wheel hub motors on the front wheels.

Production of the NGEN-1000 was planned to occur in partnership with Prefix Corporation at the Workhorse plant in Union City, Indiana; Workhorse would build the chassis while Prefix would build the composite cab and body.

The N-GEN was equipped initially with a high-voltage lithium-ion traction battery assembled by Workhorse from cylindrical commodity 18650 battery cells supplied by Panasonic.

UPS Class 5 E-GEN
The E-GEN is a range extended electric vehicle, with a  all-electric range and an additional  from the integrated BMW-supplied gasoline engine. The Class 5 truck prototype for UPS, first shown in May 2018, used the E-GEN chassis and battery pack with a Morgan Olson walk-in body, driven by an electric axle jointly developed by Workhorse and Dana Incorporated.

C-Series
The "C" in the name refers to the vehicle's structural composite body, while the number provides the nominal cargo volume, in cubic feet. The sandwich-structured composite materials used two layers of fiberglass over lightweight cores that included balsa wood and polypropylene; further weight reduction was accomplished by using aluminum where possible. A smaller C-650 was planned for production.

Unlike most cargo vans, which are equipped with a rear beam axle, the C-Series is equipped with an independent rear suspension using air shocks. The rear suspension uses a trailing-arm design, while the front uses a short/long-arm design with coil springs.

Workhorse plan to offer an all-wheel drive variant, driving the front wheels using wheel hub motors.

Equipped with a lithium nickel manganese cobalt oxide battery using pouch cells supplied by EnerDel that has a total capacity of 70 kW-hr and a nominal voltage of 420 V, preliminary testing with a C-1000 prototype showed a  range. The C-1000 could be equipped with two, four, or six battery modules, providing 35, 70, or 105 kW-hr of storage capacity, respectively; the smaller C-650 could be equipped with two or four of the same modules, with corresponding capacities. The battery management controller can handle a recharge rate of up to 200 kW (DC), although Workhorse anticipate the C-Series will typically be charged overnight using Level 2 AC charging at 7 kW, with 14 or 22 kW (AC) available as options.

References

External links
 

Electric vans